The Hydrus (also known as Enhydros, Enidros, Hildris, Hydra, Idra, Idres, Ydre, Ydris, and Ydrus) is a creature from Medieval bestiaries. They were said to be found in the Nile River.  While in the Nile, a crocodile would roll the hydrus in the mud before eating the smaller creature.  However, once inside the crocodile's stomach, the hydrus would burst free from the stomach lining.  Another interpretation is that the hydrus would intentionally roll in the mud and seek out the crocodile while it slept with its mouth open.  In medieval Christian tradition, this bursting free from the crocodile became an emblem of the resurrection of Christ bursting free from Hell.

There is considerable confusion in applying the name hydrus and its variations to beasts. The root of the word itself refers to water, and this led to several beasts, mostly serpents, being so labeled. Isidore of Seville lists the hydros, a water snake that causes those bitten to swell up, the cure for which is the dung of an ox. The hydrus was also confused with the Hydra of the Hercules legend, some texts saying that it was a many-headed water dragon, living in the swamp of Lerna, that could grow new heads.

Appearance 
A hydrus has no set appearance. Normally it is considered to be a water snake, although Pliny the Elder believed that it was an otter. Other animals the hydrus has been thought of as include a bird, a dragon, and a mongoose.

References 

Medieval European legendary creatures
Legendary serpents
Dragons